The re-in-station of the Kuwait Federation Cup tournament saw all 15 kuwaiti clubs participating in 3 groups.

Group stage

Group 1

Group 2

Group 3

Knockout stage
All 3 top teams of each group advances and best 2nd placed team advances, a new draw is held.

Reference

Kuwait Federation Cup